The Petrel was a British sounding rocket. The Petrel 1 was launched, like the Skua 1, with 3 Chick booster rockets. The Chick motors were fitted into a Booster Carriage that also carried the two parachutes that brought it back to earth for re-use. The Petrel 1 was 3.34 m long, had a diameter of 19 cm and reached a maximum altitude of 140 kilometres.

The Petrel was first flown on 8 June 1967 in South Uist. Since 1968, some 234 Petrels have been launched from sites in South Uist, Andeya, Kiruna, Thumba, Sonmiani and Greenland. Around 2/3 of the launches have taken place from South Uist.  In 1977 an improved version, the Petrel 2, with a maximum height of 175 kilometres was used for the first time. The Petrel was also fired from ESRANGE at Kiruna in Sweden in 1971, and from the range on Andoya, an island off the Norwegian coast in 1973. One launcher was installed at Kiruna, while two were installed on Andoya. Both could be loaded, but only one was elevated at a time. Two launchers allowed successive firings, one as an event came up and another as it decayed. The programme of Petrel Iaunchings ceased in August 1982.

To facilitate one experiment, a Petrel payload released gas clouds at apogee. The wife of one of the firing team members reported that strange lights were being seen in the night sky from Scotland.

Petrel 1
payload: 18 kg
maximum altitude: 140 km
launch thrust: 20 kN
launch weight: 130 kg
diameter: 0.19 m
length: 3.34 m

Petrel 2
payload: 18 kg
maximum altitude: 175 km
takeoff thrust: 27 kN
takeoff weight: 160 kg
diameter: 0.19 m
length: 3.70 m

See also
 Sounding rocket X-ray astronomy

References

External links
https://web.archive.org/web/20050207182449/http://www.univ-perp.fr/fuseurop/skupe_e.htm
https://web.archive.org/web/20080708220750/http://www.astronautix.com/lvs/petrel.htm
Sounding rockets of the United Kingdom